The Justice & Anti-Corruption Party or JAC is a minor political party launched in Britain before the 2010 general election and registered with the Electoral Commission on 13 April 2010. It was formed by Leslie Cummings and Donald Jerrard, who contested Portsmouth South and Hampshire East at that election.

The party contested one seat at the 2015 general election and three seats in the 2017 and 2019 general elections all in the Hampshire area.

According to the party's annual return to the Electoral Commission in 2011, "The objective of the Party is to expose fraud, corruption and other criminal activities at local and national level. This also involves exposing negligence by the regulatory authorities such as the police." The report shows that it had no members and its expenditure was £4,249. Apart from one donation of £500, all costs were met by Jerrard personally. The figures reported in 2012 were identical. In subsequent reports, the party's only recorded expenditure has been £25 annually for its registration fee, each time paid by an individual donation, and a membership of nil.

Leslie Cummings was recorded as party leader from its first registration until 2015. In 2011, he was convicted of "making a false statement to affect the return of the election" under the Representation of the People Act. In his election leaflet pamphlet, he had falsely claimed that Mike Hancock, the Liberal Democrat MP for Portsmouth South was a paedophile. He was fined £500 at Southampton Magistrates' Court. The party's current leader is Donald Jerrard. Jerrard, from Southampton, is a former business lawyer and senior partner at Baker & McKenzie. He had intended contesting Fareham for UKIP in the 2015 general election. His wife, Susan, is also a party candidate; she contested Hampshire East in 2017 polling less than 1% of the votes.

Elections contested
2010 general election

2015 general election

2017 general election

2019 general election

References

External links
The Justice & Anti-Corruption Party official website

Political parties established in 2010
Justice parties in the United Kingdom
Anti-corruption parties in the United Kingdom
2010 establishments in the United Kingdom